Born to Break is the fourth studio album by Scottish hard rock band The Amorettes, released on 6 April 2018. On 13 April, the album charted at number 13 on the Scottish Albums Chart.

Recording
For their fourth album, The Amorettes retained the production personnel used on their previous album, White Hot Heat, released in 2016. Producer Luke Morley of Thunder was joined by engineer Nick Brine (The Darkness, Bruce Springsteen) for the recording sessions which took place at Rockfield Studios in Wales.

All the tracks on the album were composed by lead guitarist and vocalist Gill Montgomery, although the lyrics for "Everything I Learned I Learned from Rock and Roll", the first single from the album, were written by Black Star Riders frontman Ricky Warwick. Warwick said the song was "based on personal experience, and a nod to some of the great artists out there who have shaped and defined our rock n roll identity." Three other tracks on the album were co-written with Morley.

Reception
Describing the band as "the best band out of Scotland since The Almighty", Neil Johnson of Louder Than War cited the "more refined and considered songcraft" of Born to Break compared to its predecessor, describing it as "honest to goodness, spit and sawdust rock 'n' roll".

Gerald Stansbury of Über Rock described the album as diverse, and rising high above the band's previous records. Focusing on the album's strong riffs, catchy choruses and outstanding performances from all three members of the band, he described Born to Break as "a classic album that will be an album of the year contender".

On 16 February 2018, the band released the first single from the album, "Everything I Learned I Learned from Rock and Roll", which was voted Classic Rock'''s track of the week for the last week of March, and was performed on Live at Five on Scottish television channel STV2 on 4 April.

The second single from Born to Break'', "Whatever Gets You Through the Night", was released on 13 July. The song received the band's first national radio airplay on 9 July, on Johnnie Walker's Rock Show on BBC Radio 2. A third single, "Born to Break", was released on 2 November.

Track listing

Personnel
Gill Montgomery – guitar, vocals
Heather McKay – bass guitar, backing vocals
Hannah McKay – drums, backing vocals
Luke Morley – production
Nick Brine – engineering and mixing
Pete Maher – mastering
Gill Montgomery – artwork
Chris Childs – artwork support
Geordy Van Velzen – photography

Charts

References

2018 albums
SPV/Steamhammer albums
Albums recorded at Rockfield Studios